A list of films produced in France in 1925:

See also
 1925 in France

References

External links
 
 French films of 1925 at the Internet Movie Database
 French films of 1925 at Cinema-francais.fr

1925
Lists of 1925 films by country or language
Films